Celebrity Name Game is an Australian television game show, presented by Grant Denyer and based on the American game show of the same name which is in turn based on the board game Identity Crisis. The following is a list or overview of Celebrity Name Game episodes and includes information such as celebrities assigned to contestants, contestant names and information on the outcome of the game.

Overview

Episodes

2019 Edition
Note: Winners are listed in bold. Winners who won $10,000 are highlighted in green.

Neighbours 35th Anniversary (2020)

Summer Edition (2019–20)
Note: Repeats of the first season aired on 10 Bold over the Summer non-ratings period and during the first and second quarters. Winners are listed in bold. Winners who won $10,000 are highlighted in green.

References

Celebrity Name Game
Celebrity Name Game